Denton Corker Marshall is an international architecture practice based in Melbourne, Australia.

History 

Denton Corker Marshall was established in Melbourne, Victoria, in 1972. It was founded by architects John Denton, Bill Corker, and Barrie Marshall.

Description and work
While Melbourne remains the design base, the firm has additional practices in London, Manchester, and Jakarta, with over 510 projects in 37 different countries.

In Australia, Denton Corker Marshall is best known for landmark buildings such as the Melbourne Museum, which features a "blade" section of roof rising to 35 metres, enclosing a small rainforest, the Melbourne Exhibition Centre, which has a roof resembling a giant aircraft wing, and the Melbourne Gateway and Bolte Bridge, both part of the CityLink project.  The firm's work in Australia has been frequently and variously described as modernist, minimalist, sculptural and heroic. The practice has been consistently publicized in awards series, news and magazines in the past decades in addition to being covered in several monographic publications.

Other projects by the practice include the multi-award-winning Manchester Civil Justice Centre, a new visitors' centre at Stonehenge, Sydney's Governor Phillip Tower, the Museum of Sydney, extensions to the Australian War Memorial and Australian embassies in Tokyo and Beijing. The Australian Embassy in Beijing was the practice's first China project, establishing the practice's strong association with China over three decades. In recent years Denton Corker Marshall’s work has extended to more than 20 cities in Asia. In 2015, Denton Corker Marshall were selected to build the Australian Pavilion for the Venice Biennale.

People

In 2005, John Denton was appointed as the first State Architect for Victoria for a two-year term.  he is chairperson of the board at the Australian Centre for Contemporary Art (ACCA). He is a Life Fellow of the Royal Australian Institute of Architects (RAIA), and in 1996 received the RAIA Gold Medal.

Notable projects

Denton Corker Marshall has designed some of Australasia's landmark buildings including the following major architectural projects:

Gallery

See also

Architecture of Australia

References

Further reading
 Haig Beck, Jackie Cooper, Peter G. Rowe, Deyan Sudjic: Denton Corker Marshall, Birkhäuser, Basel, 2000
 Haig Beck, Jackie Cooper, Deyan Sudjic: Houses.Denton Corker Marshall, Birkhauser Verlag AG (29 May 2013)
 Walking Melbourne
 RMIT Architecture blog
 ABC Documentary:The Mind of an Architect Episode 2
 Meet the architect - Denton Corker Marshall
 Meet the architect - Denton Corker Marshall

External links

 

Architecture firms of Australia
Recipients of the Royal Australian Institute of Architects’ Gold Medal
Architecture firms based in Victoria (Australia)